Noel Trinidad (born ) is a Filipino television, film, and theater actor and comedian.

Career
Trinidad started his acting career on radio. He read lines for radio before a live audience which he used to improve upon his facial expressions.

His first film appearance was for a work of Lamberto Avellana which revolved around the Hukbalahap Rebellion. Trinidad portrayed the son of the protagonist. He also joined Avellana's Barangay Theater Guild, and later the Repertory Philippines upon its formation in the 1960s.

Trinidad was best known for being part of a comedy duo with Subas Herrero, especially in the 1981 television series Champoy which aired in RPN. The two are childhood friends who often acted in plays as part of a glee club in school. Their first professional act together was in the 1970s film Sinta.

He also acted in the 1982 film Batch '81 which was directed by Mike de Leon.

He would star in the film Family Matters which is set to premiere at the 2022 Metro Manila Film Festival. Trinidad was  remarked that the film could be he last due to his hearing issues by this time.

Personal life
Noel Trinidad is married to Lally Laurel. 

He has Joel as his son, who is also an actor. Trinidad also previously worked in an advertising agency.

His father is Francisco "Koko" Trinidad while his mother is Lina Flor who are regarded for being pioneers of the Philippines radio industry. Flor is known for writing the radio drama series Gulong ng Palad.

Filmography

External links

References

Filipino male film actors
Filipino male stage actors
Filipino male television actors
Filipino comedians
1940s births
Living people
Place of birth missing (living people)